Frangistan was a term used by Muslims and Persians in particular, during the Middle Ages and later historical periods to refer to Western or Latin Europe.

Frangistan literally means "Land of the Franks", from Farang which is the Persianized form of Frank plus the suffix -istan coming from the Persian language.
During the Crusades, the Muslims of the Middle East came to call the invading Western (Latin) Christians Franks, originally the name for inhabitants of the largest of the Latin Christian realms in Europe, Francia, which gave its name to the Kingdom of France (although its eastern parts came to be known as the Holy Roman Empire).

This name was in contrast to the name used by Arabs for their longstanding Eastern Christian neighbors the Greek Orthodox Christians of the Byzantine (Eastern Roman) Empire, who were called "Rumis", named for Rûm (derived from "Rome", i.e. the medieval Eastern Roman Empire with its capital in Constantinople). 

As the Franks (French) formed a substantial part of the force of the First Crusade, and Old French became the dominant language in the crusader states of the 12th century (notably the Principality of Antioch), the term Frank as used in the Levant could mean any Western European (Latin) Christian (whether Frankish, Saxon, Flemish, etc.). Frangistan was not a clearly defined area and may have referred to any land perceived to be Western European Christian by contemporary Muslims.

Conversely, Christians generally called Muslims Saracens or Moors, both after the names of more localized tribes, in Arabia and Mauretania, respectively.

The term Frangistan was still in use in the time of the Ottoman Empire, in sources as late as the 17th century. While in Persia, it remained in use until the end of the Qajar dynasty as observed in various correspondences and administrative documents of that era to refer to European countries. Other derivatives of this word such as Farang (noun), Farangi (adjective), and compound words like Farangi Ma'āb (literally French-styled), are used with lower frequency in Modern Persian, and without any negative connotation. In Hindi in present-day India, all Europeans in general are still referred to as Firang.

See also
 The Mediterranean Lingua Franca was a pidgin spoken among Europeans ("Franks") and Muslims.
 Franco-Levantines
 Farang, the medieval Persian word for the Franks, which referred to Western Europeans in general
 Rûm, the Islamic word for Byzantium and the Byzantines, meaning "Rome" or "Romans"

References

Frangistan
Persian words and phrases
Catholicism in the Middle Ages
Ethno-cultural designations
Exonyms